Tritomaria is a genus of liverworts belonging to the family Lophoziaceae.

The genus was first described by Victor Félix Schiffner.

The genus has cosmopolitan distribution.

Species:
 Tritomaria exsectiformis (Breidl.) Schiffn. ex Loeske

References

Jungermanniales
Jungermanniales genera